Arthur Herbert Evelyn Mattingley (1870-1950), noted Australian bird photographer and ornithologist, was a founding member of the Royal Australasian Ornithologists Union (RAOU) in 1901.  He worked for over 40 years with the Commonwealth Customs Department in Melbourne.  He also served as President of the RAOU 1913-1914 as well as organising ornithological expeditions to the Bass Strait islands and to central and northern Australia.

Australian ornithologists
Australian photographers
1870 births
1950 deaths
Australian public servants